Cognac & Conversation is the second album by American R&B-soul singer Teedra Moses, released in the United States on August 8, 2015 by Shanachie Records. This is her first album in 11 years since her debut album Complex Simplicity.

Track listing

Charts

References

Teedra Moses albums
2015 albums